The  opened in Asahikawa, Hokkaidō, Japan in 1993. Dedicated to author Yasushi Inoue, born in Asahikawa in 1907, the museum displays some five hundred items from its collection of a thousand objects, mostly books. In 2012 the study and reception room from the author's former residence in Setagaya were transferred to the museum.

See also
 Asahikawa Museum of Sculpture

References

External links

 Yasushi Inoue Memorial Hall 
 Yasushi Inoue Memorial Hall 

Museums in Asahikawa
Literary museums in Japan
Biographical museums in Japan
1993 establishments in Japan
Museums established in 1993